The Watermans are a family of politicians from the United States. Below is a list of members:

David Waterman, Connecticut State Representative 1794 1800. Brother of Luther Waterman.
Luther Waterman (1753–1807), New York Assemblyman 1804–1805. Brother of David Waterman.
Elisha Waterman (1777–1857), Connecticut State Representative 1824 1827, Connecticut State Senator 1837. Second cousin once removed of David Waterman and Luther Waterman.
Thomas G. Waterman (1787–1862), District Attorney of Broome County, New York 1822–1823; New York Assemblyman 1824; New York State Senator 1827–1830. Son of David Waterman.
William H. Waterman (1813–1867), Mayor of Racine, Wisconsin 1851. Second cousin twice removed of David Waterman and Luther Waterman.
Charles M. Waterman, Mayor of New Orleans, Louisiana 1856–1858. Third cousin twice removed of David Waterman and Luther Waterman.
Alexander H. Waterman (1825–1856), U.S. Consul in Curaçao 1856. Second cousin thrice removed of David Waterman and Luther Waterman.
Robert W. Waterman (1826–1891), Lieutenant Governor of California 1887, Governor of California 1887–1891. Second cousin thrice removed of David Waterman and Luther Waterman.
Sterry R. Waterman (1901–1984), delegate to the Republican National Convention 1936, Judge of the U.S. Court of Appeals 1955–1970. Second cousin four times removed of David Waterman and Luther Waterman.
Herbert Martin Waterman, Maine State Representative 1925–1926. Third cousin twice removed of Charles M. Waterman.
Jennifer Waterman (1923-1987) Family moves to Hammersmith, London
Henrietta II Waterman (1955-2010) married to Phillip Derham (1947-2013)

See also
List of United States political families

References

Political families of the United States